The Electoral Act 1993 is an Act of the New Zealand Parliament for regulating elections in New Zealand. It "establishes the electoral agencies, electoral system, election processes (including that for disputing results), how MPs are replaced between elections, registration processes for political parties and logos, enrolment and electoral roll requirements, and provides for the Māori Electoral option, and the Representation Commission." One such agency is the Electoral Commission which is responsible, among other things, for the administration of parliamentary elections and referendums.

The Electoral Act forms part of the constitution of New Zealand. The regulations made under the Act contain most of New Zealand's electoral legislation. The Act defined mixed-member proportional (MMP) representation for use in the 1993 electoral referendum, and it established MMP as the electoral system for the 1996 general election.

See also 

Broadcasting Standards Authority
2005 New Zealand election funding controversy
 New Zealand Electoral Commission
 Constitution Act 1986 § Entrenchment

References

External links 
 New Zealand Electoral Commission's website

1993 in New Zealand law
Statutes of New Zealand
Constitution of New Zealand